The 39th Deauville American Film Festival took place at Deauville, France from August 30 to September 8, 2013. Steven Soderbergh's drama film Behind the Candelabra served as the opening night film. Snowpiercer by Bong Joon-ho was the closing night film of the festival. The Grand Prix was awarded to Night Moves by Kelly Reichardt.

Complete lineup for the festival was announced on July 19, 2013, including episodes from Television shows for the Television section at the festival. Electronic music duo Justice was given Carte blanche section to show nine of their favourite American films to the festival audience. The festival paid tribute to Cate Blanchett, Nicolas Cage, Larry Clark, Gale Anne Hurd and John Travolta and hosted retrospective of their films. The festival honoured American actor, singer, dancer, and comedian Danny Kaye with Deauville Legend award.

Juries

Main Competition
Vincent Lindon: French actor and film director (President of Jury) 
Lou Doillon: French model, singer, and actress
Jean Echenoz: French writer
Hélène Fillières: French actress, film director and screenwriter  
Xavier Giannoli: French film director, screenwriter and producer 
Famke Janssen: Dutch actress, director, screenwriter and former fashion model
Pierre Lescure: French journalist and television executive  
Bruno Nuytten: French cinematographer and director
Rebecca Zlotowski: French film director and screenwriter

Cartier revelation jury
Valérie Donzelli: French actress, director and screenwriter (President of Jury)  
Laurence Arné: French actress  
Vincent Lacoste: French actor  
Géraldine Maillet: French novelist, screenwriter and director 
Yoann Lemoine: French music video director, graphic designer and singer-songwriter

Programme

Competition
A Single Shot by David M. Rosenthal
Ain't Them Bodies Saints by David Lowery
All Is Lost by J. C. Chandor
Blue Caprice by Alexandre Moors
Blue Ruin by Jeremy Saulnier
Breathe In by Drake Doremus
Fruitvale Station by Ryan Coogler
Lily by Matt Creed
Night Moves by Kelly Reichardt
Short Term 12 by Destin Daniel Cretton
Stand Clear of the Closing Doors by Sam Fleischner
Sweetwater by Logan Miller
The Retrieval by Chris Eska
We Are What We Are by Jim Mickle

Les Premières (Premieres)
Behind the Candelabra by Steven Soderbergh
Blue Jasmine by Woody Allen
Joe by David Gordon Green
Killing Season by Mark Steven Johnson
The Butler by Lee Daniels
Lovelace by Rob Epstein and Jeffrey Friedman
Marfa Girl by Larry Clark
Pain & Gain by Michael Bay
Parkland by Peter Landesman
Planes by Klay Hall
Snowpiercer by Bong Joon-ho
Sunlight Jr. by Laurie Collyer
The Frozen Ground by Scott Walker
Charlie Countryman by Fredrik Bond
The Wait by M. Blash
Upstream Color by Shane Carruth
Very Good Girls by Naomi Foner Gyllenhaal
White House Down by Roland Emmerich
Wrong Cops by Quentin Dupieux

Les Docs De L'Oncle Sam (Uncle Sam's Doc)
Dancing in Jaffa by Hilla Medalia
Inequality for All by Jacob Kornbluth
Our Nixon by Penny Lane
Seduced and Abandoned by James Toback
20 Feet from Stardom by Morgan Neville

La Nuit américaine (American cinema overview)
Adaptation by Spike Jonze
Another Day in Paradise by Larry Clark
Armageddon by Michael Bay
Babel by Alejandro González Iñárritu
Bad Lieutenant: Port of Call New Orleans by Werner Herzog
Blow Out by Brian De Palma
Bringing Out the Dead by Martin Scorsese
Bully by Larry Clark
Elizabeth by Shekhar Kapur
Get Shorty by Barry Sonnenfeld
Hairspray by Adam Shankman
Indiana Jones and the Kingdom of the Crystal Skull by Steven Spielberg
I'm Not There by Todd Haynes
Ken Park by Larry Clark and Edward Lachman
Kids by Larry Clark
Leaving Las Vegas by Mike Figgis
Lord of War by Andrew Niccol
Primary Colors by Mike Nichols
Pulp Fiction by Quentin Tarantino
The Aviator by Martin Scorsese
The Curious Case of Benjamin Button by David Fincher
The Terminator by James Cameron
Veronica Guerin by Joel Schumacher
Wassup Rockers by Larry Clark
Wild at Heart by David Lynch

Carte blanche
Blade Runner by Ridley Scott
Die Hard by John McTiernan
Dog Day Afternoon by Sidney Lumet
Escape from Alcatraz by Don Siegel
Eyes Wide Shut by Stanley Kubrick
Ferris Bueller's Day Off by John Hughes
Happiness by Todd Solondz
The Fugitive by Andrew Davis
Youth in Revolt by Miguel Arteta

Hommage Deauville Legend (Tribute Deauville Legend)
The Secret Life of Walter Mitty by Norman Z. McLeod
On the Riviera by Walter Lang
White Christmas by Michael Curtiz

Television
Bates Motel by Carlton Cuse, Kerry Ehrin and Anthony Cipriano
The Curse Of Edgar by Marc Dugain
Once Upon a Time by Edward Kitsis and Adam Horowitz
The Following by Kevin Williamson

Awards

The festival awarded the following awards:
Grand Prix (Grand Special Prize): Night Moves by Kelly Reichardt
Prix du Jury (Jury Special Prize): All Is Lost by J. C. Chandor and Stand Clear of the Closing Doors by Sam Fleischner
Prix du Public (Audience Award): Fruitvale Station by Ryan Coogler
Prix de la Critique Internationale (International Critics' prize): The Retrieval by Chris Eska
Prix Michel d'Ornano (Michel d'Ornano Award for debut French film): Me, Myself and Mum by Guillaume Gallienne
Prix de la Révélation Cartier (Cartier Revelation Prize): Fruitvale Station by Ryan Coogler
Lucien Barrière Prize for Literature:
Canada by Richard Ford
Tributes:
Cate Blanchett
Nicolas Cage
Larry Clark
Gale Anne Hurd
John Travolta
Deauville Legend:
Danny Kaye

References

External links

 Official site
 2013 Official Press Kit
 Deauville American Film Festival:2013 at Internet Movie Database

2013 in French cinema
2013 film festivals
2013 festivals in Europe
21st century in France
Film festivals in France